The individual eventing competition of the equestrian events at the 2011 Pan American Games took place in Mexico between October 21–23 at the Guadalajara Country Club and the Hipica Club.  The defending Pan American champion was Karen O'Connor of the United States of America.

Schedule
All times are Central Standard Time (UTC-6).

Results

References

Equestrian at the 2011 Pan American Games